Stiofán Ó Fearail is an Irish singer, songwriter, musician and television presenter originally from Roscommon, Ireland. He is a founding member of the bilingual contemporary folk group Seo Linn alongside Daithí Ó Ruaidh, Keith Ó Briain and Kev Shortall.

In 2016, he won Réalta Óg na Bliana (Young Star of the Year Award) at the Oireachtas Media Awards in Galway for his role as presenter on the TG4 series Cleas Act.

Music 

Ó Fearail plays the guitar, writes and sings for folk/indie group, Seo Linn. He began his musical career working in Coláiste Lurgan as a musical director where he met current band members Daithí Ó Ruaidh, Keith Ó Briain and Kevin Shortall. After a series of successful summers translating and recording popular songs with TG Lurgan, Ó Fearail, Ó Ruaidh, Ó Briain and Shortall, along with previous members Cathal Ó Ruaidh and Jenny Ní Ruiséil, formed Seo Linn.

Television 

Ó Fearail was a judge on Scór Encore (2014), Junior Eurovision (2015) on TG4. He also presented Cleas Act for 3 seasons (2016 - 2018).

Personal life 
Ó Fearail is a qualified primary school teacher out of St Patrick's College, Dublin. He taught at Scoil Chaitlín Maude in Tallaght. He is an avid follower of Gaelic Football and supports Roscommon GAA. He is an Irish language advocate and has worked on various initiatives promoting the language.

Discography

Filmography

References

External links 

 Official Facebook Page

21st-century Irish male singers
Irish musicians
People from County Roscommon
Irish-language singers